Sundaranga Jaana is a 2016 Indian Kannada-language romantic comedy film directed by Ramesh Aravind. The film is a remake of the 2015 Telugu film Bhale Bhale Magadivoy, and stars Ganesh and Shanvi Srivastava in the lead roles. Devaraj and Ravishankar Gowda feature in supporting roles. The film is being produced by Rockline Venkatesh and Allu Aravind under the banner Rockline & Allu Aravind Productions. The title of the film was taken from a track of the same title from the 1970 Kannada film Samshaya Phala. Filming began on 25 February 2016.

The film was earlier titled as Gandu Endare Gandu and later rechristened to Sundaranga Jaana. Film marked the debuts of many young talents like dialogue writer Guruprasad, actor & lyricist Pradyumna Narahalli, singer Lavanya and lyricist Balachander.

Plot 
Lucky is an absent-minded junior botanist who is easily distracted by other tasks while working on his current research. His father arranges his marriage with the daughter of Panduranga Rao, a senior botanist. Rao decides to break the alliance after learning about Lucky's mental condition and warns him not to show up again. On his way to donate blood to his boss, Lucky falls in love with Nandana, a kuchipudi dance teacher, and gets diverted. He creates a positive impression by unknowingly donating blood to one of her students. In their frequent meetings, Lucky keeps forgetting things (such as going out without his shoes, giving away his motorbike keys to a beggar, etc.), but manages to hide this shortcoming from Nandana by claiming he is a philanthropist. He is unaware of the fact that Nandana is Rao's daughter, the young woman whom he was supposed to marry before. Rao's friend's son Ajay, a police inspector, also falls in love with Nandana, while she is waiting for Lucky's proposal. When he tries to propose on her birthday, Lucky ends up taking Nandana's pregnant sister-in-law, who is experiencing labour pains, to a nearby hospital. After the delivery, Nandana proposes to Lucky, and they become a couple.

Nandana informs Lucky that her father has accepted their proposal and wants to meet him. Lucky and Rao meet as strangers when Rao insults Lucky after an incident with a little girl who was about to fall into a pond. Lucky later realises that Nandana is Rao's daughter and flees. Lucky and Nandana plan to meet later. Lucky makes his friend Ali pose as Nandana's lover, and he joins Rao as an apprentice. When Nandana's relatives attend the naming ceremony of the new born child, Rao's nephew assumes Lucky's friend is her potential lover, and all the others assume Lucky is Nandana's suitor. Rao's nephew becomes further confused when Lucky visits a sick Nandana to spend some quality time with her. Days later, Rao wants Lucky to escort Nandana and her relatives to Srisailam. Lucky, driving, misses a turn and reaches the outskirts of Bangalore. He takes them to a nearby temple and explains that it is a very special and historically significant temple.

Ajay, who is confused about the identity of Nandana's lover (as Lucky and his friend keep changing places depending on who is around at the moment) manages to get a video of Lucky romancing Nandana. When they all arrive back home, Ajay reveals Lucky's mental condition to Nandana, and they break up. On the day of Nandana's engagement with Ajay, Rao, who has become aware of the sincerity of Lucky's love, advises her to choose Lucky over Ajay. When Ajay protests, wrong talk Ramanujam advises his son against any stupid attempts to marry the girl by force. Rao meets Lucky's parents and reveals that he has been aware of his love for Nandana. He says he is willing to get his daughter and Lucky married to each other. Lucky by now decides to go to Canada for work. Rao and Luckys parents head to airport but the Canada flight would have taken off. When they get disappointed, Lucky's mother notices that Lucky is still sitting in passenger lounge. When they enquire, he says he had taken pass book instead of passport. Lucky's forgetfulness helps him miss the flight and gives him an opportunity to meet his love. Nandhana comes to airport and meets Lucky. Lucky and Nandhana marry and they live happily in their fantasy world.

Cast
 Ganesh as Lucky aka Lakshman Prasad. Who forgets everything falls in love with Nandu 
 Shanvi Srivastava as Nandana aka Nandu, lucky's love interest, Panduranga Rao's daughter
 Devaraj as Panduranga Rao, Nandana's Father
 Ravishankar Gowda as Ali / 'Lucky' Lucky's friend 
 Rangayana Raghu as Anjaneya Lucky's Father
 Sadhu Kokila as Hanumantha Rao, Nandana's Uncle
 Sihi Kahi Chandru as Wrong Talk Ramanujam, Panduranga Rao's friend, Ajay's father 
 Vasishta N. Simha as Inspector Ajay, Nandana's suitor 
 Pradyumna Narahalli as Gungru (Lucky's Friend)
 Veena Sundar as Lucky's Mother
 Jyothi Rai as Nandana's sister-in-law

Soundtrack

B. Ajaneesh Loknath composed the film's songs. Lyrics were penned by Jayant Kaikini and two debutant lyricists Pradyumna Narahalli and Balu. The soundtrack album consists of four tracks.

References

External links 

2016 films
Kannada remakes of Telugu films
Indian romantic comedy films
Rockline Entertainments films
2010s Kannada-language films
2016 romantic comedy films
Films directed by Ramesh Aravind